HMBS Nassau (P-61) is one of two patrol boats, with , operated by the Bahamian military. Like her sister ship, Nassau is armed with several heavy Browning M2 .50 caliber machine guns and a light auto cannon. She is commonly used for capturing illegal immigrants (particularly from Haiti), anti-piracy and smuggling missions, hurricane relief, search and rescue, routine patrols, and assisting maritime police.

In August 2016 Nassau arrived in the Netherlands for a nine-month refit at the Damen Group's Maaskant shipyard at Stellendam.

References

 (List of active ships)

Naval ships of the Bahamas
Bahamas-class patrol boats